Sir Richard Whittington, KCMG, CBE (22 June 1905 – 18 August 1975) was a British diplomat. He was British Ambassador to Thailand from 1957 to 1961.

References

1905 births
1975 deaths
Ambassadors of the United Kingdom to Thailand
Place of birth missing
Place of death missing
Knights Commander of the Order of St Michael and St George
Commanders of the Order of the British Empire